Tahlegi-ye Sofla (also Romanized as Tahlehgī-ye Soflá; also known as Tahlehgī) is a village in Ashayer Rural District, in the Central District of Fereydunshahr County, Isfahan Province, Iran. At the 2006 census, its population was 95, in 17 families.

References 

Populated places in Fereydunshahr County